Chela macrolepis is a danionins fish in the family Cyprinidae. It is endemic to Chembarambakkam Lake in India.

References

Chela (fish)
Freshwater fish of India
Fish described in 2014